Lorenzo Burrows (March 15, 1805 – March 6, 1885) was an American merchant, banker and politician.

Life
He attended the academies at Plainfield, Connecticut and Westerly, Rhode Island. He moved to New York and settled in Albion, N.Y., in 1824. He was employed as a clerk until 1826 when he engaged in mercantile pursuits. He assisted in establishing the Bank of Albion in 1839 and served as cashier. He was Treasurer of Orleans County in 1840 and was Assignee in bankruptcy for Orleans County in 1841. He was Supervisor of the Town of Barre in 1845, and was elected as a Whig to the 31st and 32nd United States Congresses, serving from March 4, 1849 to March 4, 1853.

In August 1852, he declined to be appointed United States Postmaster General by President Millard Fillmore. Instead, Fillmore (a fellow New York Whig) chose Connecticut Whig Samuel Dickinson Hubbard.

He was eighteenth New York State Comptroller from 1856 to 1857, elected on the American Party ticket in 1855. He won 33.98% of the vote over the Republican, and the two Democrats.

He ran unsuccessfully for Governor of New York on the American Party ticket in 1858. Unlike three years previously, where he won with slightly over a third of the vote, he only narrowly got over ten percent this election while both the reunited Democratic Party and the recently established Republican Party both won over forty percent.

He was director of the Niagara Falls International Bridge Co. He was chosen as a regent of New York University in 1858 and appointed one of the commissioners of Mount Albion Cemetery in 1862, serving in both of these capacities until his death in 1885. He was buried at Mount Albion.

His uncle Daniel Burrows was a United States Representative from Connecticut. His brother Latham A. Burrows was a New York State Senator. Both served in Congress or in the state legislature in the 1820s.

References

Sources

 Political Graveyard
 His declination to be Postmaster General, in NYT on August 27, 1852
Google Books The New York Civil List compiled by Franklin Benjamin Hough (page 34; Weed, Parsons and Co., 1858)

1805 births
1885 deaths
People from Groton, Connecticut
People from Albion, Orleans County, New York
New York State Comptrollers
American bankers
New York (state) Know Nothings
Regents of the University of the State of New York
Whig Party members of the United States House of Representatives from New York (state)
19th-century American politicians
19th-century American businesspeople